The Gibbs Quadski is an amphibious quad bike/ATV, launched in October 2012 by Gibbs Sports Amphibians. The Quadski is a 4-stroke amphiquad that converts to a personal watercraft.

Developed and manufactured by a Detroit-based team, the Quadski shares a number of features with the Gibbs Aquada. It uses a marinised version of BMW Motorrad's 1.3-liter engine from the K1300S, developing , although power is further curtailed to about  when in land mode. When entering the water, by pressing a button the driver can retract the wheels into the wheel wells within the vehicle’s body and detach them from the drive train. On water, the Quadski uses a stone guard-protected intake, which draws in water before directing it through the engine-driven impeller, which, with the stator blades and nozzle, propels the Quadski at high speed. The steering nozzle at the Quadski’s rear directs the vehicle via the handlebars.

Approximately 1000 Quadski were produced in Michigan, USA, from 2012 to 2016, when production ended. The vehicle is no longer manufactured, either by Gibbs or under official license. An unlicensed copy of the Quadski has been attempted by the Chinese company 'Hison'. However, an actual Quadski is used in much of the marketing material, and there is no strong evidence that the imitation vehicle functions as an amphibian, as one user reported it is a poorly made copy of the original Gibbs, lacking many features, safety and quality.

Official Quadski parts & technical support are supplied by Gibbs Amphibians in New Zealand.

Appearance on Top Gear 
A Quadski was used in a 2014 episode of British motoring show Top Gear, when Jeremy Clarkson raced it across Lake Como against an Alfa Romeo 4C driven by co-host Richard Hammond. Despite arriving at the finish line first, Clarkson proceeded to concede the race to the Alfa.

See also
 Amphicar (1961)
 Gibbs Aquada (2004)
 Gibbs Humdinga (2012)
 Iguana Yachts (2012)
 WaterCar
 All-terrain vehicle (ATV)
 Amphibious ATV (AATV)

References

External links 
 

Wheeled amphibious vehicles